Chao Inthaphom (died 1776), also known as his regnal name Intharavongsa, was a king of Luang Phrabang (r. 1749).

Inthaphom was the eighth son of Inthasom. He had defeated the Vietnamese invasion in 1749. He was crowned the king instead of his elder brother, however, he ruled only eighth months and abdicated in favor of his elder brother Sotikakumman. He died in 1776.

References

Kings of Luang Phrabang
1776 deaths
18th-century Laotian people